A Thousand Small Sanities: The Moral Adventure of Liberalism is a nonfiction book authored by Adam Gopnik and published by Basic Books on May 14, 2019.

About the book
The book explores concepts surrounding liberalism, humanism, and conservatism. The main theme of the book is that liberalism and liberals are under attack, not just from the right, but also from the left. This phenomenon is riding a wave "of events that threaten democracy and that have produced a mounting crisis of faith in liberal institutions..." 

Another theme is that liberalism is historically and presently more than "political centrism or the idea of free markets" and thus is an overarching concern for "positive, inclusive changes at all social and political levels." Presenting the history of liberalism in this context matters because understanding it and how it functions is important "in an age of resurging autocracy and rampant bigotry." 

Besides covering the roots of liberalism's and conservatism's past, historical persons are discussed, who are deemed liberal in the present and who were not deemed liberals in their own time. Gopnik avoids emphasizing connections to 17th and 18th century philosophers as well as the founders who were the original conduits for bringing a democratic system into existence during the modern age. Rather, he covers such persons as Harriet Taylor, Frederick Douglass, Emma Goldman, Bayard Rustin, George Eliot, and E. D. Morel, along with others.

Pragmatism
Another theme is engaging in the extremes of the far-left can lead to, for example, "the attempt to define liberty for everyone"—which has historically resulted in totalitarian regimes. Incremental, inclusive, liberalism is the preferred method.  Judged apolitical in tenor, the book may steer Democrats away from 2020-era progressive policies and toward a liberalism that is "sensible, skeptical, cautious, reformist, and moderate—a path to political safety" between the extremes of the left and the right. The book does not define this as a political outlook, rather it is about maintaining a practical demeanor or "temperament".

Gopnik believes he has successfully clarified the definition of "liberalism".

Reviews
Bell, responding to maintaining a practical demeanor or temperament, says: 
...it has always been an illusion. Achieving the goals of egalitarianism and toleration...always has required a clearheaded analysis of the prevailing political, social, and economic circumstances [and] the creation of a practical program based on this analysis. Temperament matters, but...privileging temperament over concrete analysis is especially dangerous, because it encourages self-defined moderate liberals to set themselves up in opposition to the supposedly extreme and immoderate leftists who are, in fact, offering the most incisive analyses of the country’s problems and the most ambitious programs to overcome them. Centrist liberals do not, at present, have comparable analyses or programs to offer...

References

External links 
 A Thousand Small Sanities.  Publisher's website. August 2019.

American non-fiction books
2019 non-fiction books
2019 in American politics
Books about liberalism
Books in political philosophy
Basic Books books